The International History Review is a peer-reviewed academic journal covering the history of international relations and the history of international thought published by Routledge. It was established in 1978 by Edward Ingram, Gordon Martel and Ian Muggridge; the current editor-in-chief is Alan Dobson (Swansea University).

Abstracting and indexing 
The journal is abstracted and indexed in:

References

External links 
 

English-language journals
History journals
Publications established in 1979
International relations journals
Taylor & Francis academic journals
5 times per year journals